The 1952 Mississippi Southern Southerners football team represented Mississippi Southern College (now known as the University of Southern Mississippi) in the 1952 college football season. The team played in the Sun Bowl against the Pacific Tigers.  The Southerners compiled a 10–2 record, and outscored their opponents by a total of 409 to 189.

Schedule

References

Mississippi Southern
Southern Miss Golden Eagles football seasons
Mississippi Southern Southerners football